The Kamrupi people are a linguistic group that speak the Kamrupi dialects of Assamese and are found in the colonial Kamrup district region of Assam, India.

Festivals
Bihu, Durga Puja, Kali Puja, Diwali, Holi, Janmastami, Shivratri to name a few, are major festivals of the region. Muslims celebrate Eid. 
Though dance and music of the springtime Bihu from Eastern Assam was not as common in the past they are becoming popular now; in its stead "Bhatheli" in northern Kamrup, "Sori" or "Suanri" in southern Kamrup were traditional modes of celebrations. In certain areas the breakers of the "bhatheli-ghar" come from another village, resulting in a sort of mock fight between them and the local youth. In the southern part of Kamrup, where the festival is known as Sori, planting of tall bamboos is not seen, but bamboo posts, with the tuft at the top. People bow before the bamboos in northern Kamrup and they also touch them with reverence, but it does not look like any sort of bamboo worship. The common popular term to designate the three festivals corresponding to Bihu of Eastern Assam, in Western Assam, except in West Goalpara, is "Domahi", e.g., "Baihagar Domahi", "Maghar Domahi" and "Katir Domahi".

Religion
Hinduism is the major religion of the region. Hinduism is further divided into Vaishnavism and Shaktism. Hindu way of life can be observed in dressing, food and lifestyle, an important aspect of cultural identity for people of the region.

Hindu kingdoms as political identities made a long lasting impact on region defining the way of the life. In early part of second millennium, Islam arrived in region with Turkish and Afghan invaders.

Music
The folk songs of Kamrup region is known as Kamrupi Lokgeet. Kamrupi dance is a form of dance technique has been evolved from Bhaona which is a sophisticated type of dancing.

Cuisine
The Kamrupi food homogenous to certain extent with nearby eastern states of West Bengal and Bihar. Mustard seeds and coconut is generously used in cooking, while ginger, garlic, pepper and onions are extensively used. Traditional utensils are made of bell metal though stainless steel is quite common in modern times.

Notable people
 Haradatta Choudhury
 Birdatta Choudhury
 Ambikagiri Raichoudhury
 Fakhruddin Ali Ahmed
 Bishnu Ram Medhi
 Indira Goswami
 Kaliram Medhi
 Mahendra Mohan Choudhry
 Rameshwar Pathak
 Parbati Charan Das

See also
 Kamrup (disambiguation)
 Kamrupi (disambiguation)

References

External links

 
Indo-Aryan peoples
People

Assamese people